Vennandur block is a revenue block in the Namakkal district of Tamil Nadu, India. It has a total of 24 panchayat villages. Vennanthur town is the head quarter of this block.

Geography
Vennandur block is located at 11°30′37.6″N 78°05′52.5″E. It has an average elevation of 218 metres (726 ft). It is close to Alavaimalai Hills - which is part of the Eastern Ghats. The closest river is Thirumanimutharu origin from mount yercaud. Namakkal is the district capital is located around 39 km from Vennandur.Chennai is the state capital is located around 370 km from Vennandur. The other nearest state capital from Vennandr is Bangalore and its distance is 223 km, Pondicherry is 237 km and Thiruvananthapuram is 517 km.

Administrative Office & Administration
Vennandur union office  is located at Attayampatti-Masakkalipatti (DMR) road in Vennandur. In Vennandur revenue block of Namakkal District there are twenty four villages and many sub villages. All  villages  are  electrified  in  the  Vennandur block.

Agriculture 
Cent  percent  rural  in  character. The  average  rainfall  is  712.3  (in mms) in the Vennandur block. Of  the  total  food  crops,  18462  hectares  are  food  crops.  49.88 percent  are  net  area  sown  in  this  block. Paddy,  Ragi,  Cholam,  Cumbu, etc.,  are  13.40  percent  in  the  food  crops. There  are  commercial  food crops  like  groundnut,  Sugarcane,  Tapioca,  cotton,  etc.,  are  25.85 percent  in  Vennandur  block.  60.74  percent  are  other  food  crops  in Vennandur block. There  are  2607  hectares  of  land  irrigated  with  dug  wells,  4423 wells are used for irrigation in Vennandur block. The  total  number  of  agricultural  holdings  in  Vennandur  block are 6,503.

Number of Panchayat Villages (24)
Anandagoundampalayam is a village located in Vennandur block.	
Akkaraipatti	
Alampatti	
Alavaipatti	
Kallankulam	
Kattanachampatti	
Keelur	
Kuttaladampatti	
Mathiyampatti	
Mattuvelampatti
Minnakkal	
Moolakadu	
Nachipatti	
Naduppatty	
No 3 Komarapalayam	
O Sowthapuram	
Palanthinnipatti	
Pallavanaickenpatti	
Ponparappipatti	
R Pudupalayam	
Semmandapatti	
Thengalpalayam	
Thottipatti	
Thottiyavalasu

References 

Vennandur block
Revenue blocks of Namakkal district